Newcomb may refer to:

People
Newcomb (surname), includes a list of people with the name

Places

Antarctica
 Newcomb Bay

Australia
 Newcomb, Victoria, a residential suburb

United States
 Newcomb Township, Champaign County, Illinois
 Newcomb, Maryland, an unincorporated community
 Newcomb, New Mexico, a census-designated place
 Newcomb, New York, a town
 Newcomb, Tennessee, an unincorporated community

Outer space
 Newcomb (lunar crater), named after Simon Newcomb
 Newcomb (Martian crater)

Institutions
 Newcomb–Tulane College, located in New Orleans, Louisiana
 H. Sophie Newcomb Memorial College, the coordinate women's college of Tulane University
 Newcomb Art Museum, located at Tulane University, New Orleans, Louisiana
 Newcomb High School, New Mexico

Ships
 USS Newcomb (DD-586), a U.S. Navy World War II destroyer, named for Frank Newcomb
 USS Simon Newcomb (AGSC-14), a U.S. Navy World War II minesweeper

Other uses
 Newcomb Pottery, a brand of American Art Nouveau pottery
 Newcomb ball, a ball game that is a variation of volleyball
 Newcomb's paradox, thought experiment involving predicting the future

See also
 Newcomb House (disambiguation)